Loyalton is a city in Sierra County, California, United States. At the 2020 census, the population was 740, reflecting a decline of 29 from the 769 counted in 2010. The ZIP code for the community is 96118. The town is near the north extent of State Route 49, which ends at State Route 70 in Vinton. According to Rand-McNally, it is a fifty-mile drive on State Route 49 to the county seat, Downieville. Many of the population are ranchers, loggers, former loggers, or suburbanites who have relocated from the San Francisco Bay Area, Sacramento, and growing Reno–Tahoe area.

Geography
Loyalton is located at  (39.676558, -120.243157). The city is located along California State Route 49, the Gold Country Highway.

Climate
This region experiences warm (but not hot) and dry summers, with no average monthly temperatures above 71.6 °F. According to the Köppen Climate Classification system, Loyalton has a warm-summer Mediterranean climate, abbreviated "Csb" on climate maps.

Demographics

2020 
At the 2020 census Loyalton had a population of 740. The racial makeup of Loyalton was 601 (81.2%) White, 4 (0.5%) African American, 9 (1.2%) Native American, 0 (0.0%) Asian, 1 (0.1%) Pacific Islander, 45 (6.1%) from other races, and 80 (10.8%) from two or more races. Hispanic or Latino of any race were 127 people (17.6%).

2010
At the 2010 census Loyalton had a population of 769. The population density was 21 people per square mile (835.2/km). The racial makeup of Loyalton was 701 (91.2%) White, 2 (0.3%) African American, 21 (2.7%) Native American, 0 (0.0%) Asian, 0 (0.0%) Pacific Islander, 20 (2.6%) from other races, and 25 (3.3%) from two or more races. Hispanic or Latino of any race were 108 people (14.0%).

The census reported that 738 people (96.0% of the population) lived in households, no one lived in non-institutionalized group quarters and 31 (4.0%) were institutionalized.

There were 308 households, 86 (27.9%) had children under the age of 18 living in them, 163 (52.9%) were opposite-sex married couples living together, 28 (9.1%) had a female householder with no husband present, 19 (6.2%) had a male householder with no wife present. There were 25 (8.1%) unmarried opposite-sex partnerships, and 0 (0%) same-sex married couples or partnerships. 81 households (26.3%) were one person and 35 (11.4%) had someone living alone who was 65 or older. The average household size was 2.40. There were 210 families (68.2% of households); the average family size was 2.84.

The age distribution was 156 people (20.3%) under the age of 18, 55 people (7.2%) aged 18 to 24, 164 people (21.3%) aged 25 to 44, 243 people (31.6%) aged 45 to 64, and 151 people (19.6%) who were 65 or older. The median age was 46.2 years. For every 100 females, there were 101.3 males. For every 100 females age 18 and over, there were 98.4 males.

There were 371 housing units at an average density of 1,043.6 per square mile, of the occupied units 225 (73.1%) were owner-occupied and 83 (26.9%) were rented. The homeowner vacancy rate was 3.4%; the rental vacancy rate was 8.8%. 526 people (68.4% of the population) lived in owner-occupied housing units and 212 people (27.6%) lived in rental housing units.

2000
At the 2000 census there were 862 people in 323 households, including 235 families, in the city. The racial makeup of the city was 94.90% White, 0.23% African American, 2.67% Native American, 0.12% Asian, 0.58% from other races, and 1.51% from two or more races. Hispanic or Latino of any race were 7.19%.

Of the 323 households 38.4% had children under the age of 18 living with them, 53.6% were married couples living together, 11.1% had a female householder with no husband present, and 27.2% were non-families. 23.8% of households were one person and 10.2% were one person aged 65 or older. The average household size was 2.58 and the average family size was 3.00.

The age distribution was 29.1% under the age of 18, 6.0% from 18 to 24, 24.8% from 25 to 44, 24.4% from 45 to 64, and 15.7% 65 or older. The median age was 39 years. For every 100 females, there were 94.6 males. For every 100 females age 18 and over, there were 91.5 males.

The median income for a household in the city was $34,063, and the median family income was $39,750. Males had a median income of $38,864 versus $23,571 for females. The per capita income for the city was $15,732. About 20.3% of families and 18.1% of the population were below the poverty line, including 22.0% of those under age 18 and 6.7% of those age 65 or over.

Politics

Government

Local
Because Loyalton is Sierra County's most populous municipality and its only incorporated city, the location of the Sierra County Board of Supervisors twice-monthly meetings alternate between Downieville, Sierra County's county seat, and the city of Loyalton.

The City of Loyalton’s total expenditures for 2012 were $1.2 million, funded mostly from outside sources such as federal and county grants. Local tax collection revenue that year was $163,000. In 2016, the city recovered over $400,000 that had been embezzled by an employee but it still faces an $80,000 budget shortfall.

In 2012, the Loyalton City Council decided to withdraw from CalPERS because its last employee with a guaranteed pension had retired. The city had been fully paying its required annual contribution of $30,000 and had only four remaining pensioners. CalPERS then demanded $1.6 million from the city. CalPERS publicly uses actuarial present value to calculate member contributions but when a member withdraws it utilizes a non-public calculation to define unfunded liabilities. Loyalton has not yet paid the bill so CalPERS is charging 7.5% annual interest and had sent a final demand letter in September 2016.

In popular culture

Loyalton was extensively used as a filming location in the 1949 movie Beyond the Forest, starring Bette Davis and Joseph Cotten, and directed by King Vidor. Main street business facades are featured, as are the evident owners of the businesses and other townspeople. In the script, the town is referred to as "Loyalton, Wisconsin."

References

External links
 City of Loyalton
 Discover Sierra County
 Loyalton Museum

Incorporated cities and towns in California
Cities in Sierra County, California